Le Gault-du-Perche (literally Le Gault of the Perche; before 2017: Le Gault-Perche) is a commune in the Loir-et-Cher department of central France, close to the border with Eure-et-Loir.

Population

See also
Communes of the Loir-et-Cher department

References

Communes of Loir-et-Cher
Perche